The Beipiao Formation contains coal measures dated to the Early Jurassic period. Its mainly located in Xinglong County, Hebei Province

Fossil content 
 Cockroaches
 Euryblattula beipiaoensis, E. chaoyangensis
 Rhipidoblattina longa, R. mayingziensis
 Taublatta yangshugouensis

References

Bibliography 
 

Geologic formations of China
Jurassic System of Asia
Jurassic China
Pliensbachian Stage
Toarcian Stage
Coal formations
Coal in China
Paleontology in Hebei